This is a list of seasons completed by the Columbus Blue Jackets of the National Hockey League. This list documents the records and playoff results for all seasons the Blue Jackets have completed in the NHL since their inception in 2000.

Table key

Year by year

All-time records

Notes
a: As of the 2005–06 NHL season, all games will have a winner; the OTL column includes SOL (Shootout losses).
b: The season was cancelled because of the 2004–05 NHL lockout.
c: The season was shortened to 48 games because of the 2012–13 NHL lockout.
d: The NHL realigned prior to the 2013–14 season. The Blue Jackets were placed in the Metropolitan Division of the Eastern Conference.
e: The season was suspended on March 12, 2020 because of the COVID-19 pandemic. The top 24 teams in the league qualified for the playoffs.
f: Due to the COVID-19 pandemic, the 2020–21 NHL season was shortened to 56 games.

References

National Hockey League team seasons
Columbus Blue Jackets
seasons
Events in Columbus, Ohio